Sally Edwards (born September 10, 1947) is the CEO and Founder of Heart Zones, Inc. She is a best-selling and prolific author, serial entrepreneur, professional triathlete, motivational speaker, innovative app developer and a living legend. Edwards is a pioneer in modern women's sports. She supported and then qualified for the first women's marathon Olympic Trials in 1983. She is one of the original founders of the national governing body of triathlon, USA Triathlon. Edwards has been inducted into two Hall of Fames: the Triathlon Hall of Fame in 2012 and the Sacramento Running Hall of Fame in 2016. She has authored the first books written on subjects including triathlons, training with a heart rate monitor, indoor cycling with wearables, sports snowshoeing, school PE curriculums using wearable devices, and 6 subsequent books on the sport of triathlon. Altogether, Edwards has written 25 books in her effort and her focused mission to get America fit.

For twenty-two years, Edwards served as the  national spokeswoman for the Danskin Women's Triathlon Series volunteering to finish last as a professional triathlete so that no other woman would have to. Today, she runs the day-to-day of her 25 year old company, Heart Zones after developing the federally patented Heart Zones Training Method. The company currently licenses their technology in 10 countries, almost 2,000 locations including schools, health clubs, and healthcare facilities. Sally resides in Sacramento, California with her partner and her best dog companion, a red healer named Lucy.

Career 
Edwards is an entrepreneur, who has founded six companies including: 
Heart Zones Inc. an international fitness and health technology, training and education company ,
Upbeat Workouts, the new iPhone App that matches your music to your steps for runners, walkers, cyclists.
 ZONING Fitness, a patented and branded cardio exercise program using the Blink flashing zones heart rate monitor,
Fleet Feet (a national chain of franchise retail running specialty stores);
 Yuba Snowshoes (sports-performance snowshoes);  and most recently,
The Sally Edwards Company, a professional speaking business.

She is also a professional motivational speaker, who has advised thousands on how to run a successful business and on how to find and live the fitness lifestyle.

Sports career 
Sally Edwards has completed over 250 races including more than 150 Danskin Triathlons and 16 Ironman Triathlons. She is a former holder of the master's world record in the Ironman, and the past national spokesperson for the Danskin series of women-only sprint triathlons.  Her background in multi-sport competition is extensive spanning four decades. She has won the Western States 100 Mile Endurance Run, the 100 mile Iditashoe Snowshoe Race, Race Across America Relay division, and numerous marathons. She has won the Ride and Tie four times (the Ride and Tie championship is a team of two humans alternately running and riding an equine partner over a difficult 35-40 mile trail). She has also participated in adventure races around the world.

Edwards can be reached through her company, Heart Zones website or by phone +1 (916) 481-7283

Works

Books
Triathlon: A Triple Fitness Sport: The first complete guide to challenge you to a new total fitness  (1982)
The Woman Runner's Training Diary (1984)
The Triathlon Training and Racing Book (1985)
The Equilibrium Plan: Balancing Diet and Exercise for Lifetime Fitness  (1987)
Triathlons for Kids (1992)
The Heart Rate Monitor Book (1992)
Heart Rate Monitor Book (1993)
Heart Zone Training: Exercise Smart, Stay Fit, and Live Longer (1996) 
Smart Heart: High Performance Heart Zone Training (1997)
Caterpillars to Butterflies by Triathletes (from the Danskin Women's Triathlon Series) (1997). Coauthored by Maggie Sullivan
The Heart Rate Monitor Guidebook to Heart Zone Training (revised 2010)
The Heart Rate Monitor Log (2000)
The Triathlon Log  (2000)
The Complete Book of Triathlons (2001)
The Heart Rate Monitor Workbook for Indoor Cyclists (2001)  co authored by Sally Reed 
The Heart Rate Monitor Book for Outdoor and Indoor Cyclists: A Heart Zone Training Program (2002)  co authored by Sally Reed  
Triathlons for Women: Training Plans, Equipment, Nutrition (2002)
 Middle School Healthy Hearts in the Zones (2002)
High School Healthy Hearts in the Zones (2002)
Be a Better Runner: 2011
ZONING, Fitness in a Blink 2012
Smart PE: Lessons using Heart Rate Monitors and Step Trackers (2018)
Threshold Cycling: 30 Indoor Rides Using the Heart Zones Method (2020)

References 
  Profile of Sally Edwards, Sacramento Business Journal; Danielle Starkey; May 2, 2003.
  High-tech snowshoes blaze new paths, San Francisco Chronicle; Paul Kilduff; Friday, December 30, 2005.
  1999 Triathlon Hall of Fame Inductees
  Heart Zones(R) Partners - Sally Edwards

External links 
 The Sally Edwards Company Official Web Site of Sally Edwards
 Heartzones USA* Danskin Triathlon
 Trek Women's Triathlon  Sally Edwards is their spokesperson.
 Fleet Feet

1947 births
Living people
American female triathletes
American female ultramarathon runners
Sportspeople from Sacramento, California
People from Loomis, California
21st-century American women